National conservatism is a nationalist variant of conservatism that concentrates on upholding national and cultural identity. National conservatives usually combine nationalism with conservative stances promoting traditional cultural values, family values, and opposition to immigration.

It shares characteristics with traditionalist conservatism and social conservatism since all three variations focus on preservation and tradition. As national conservatism seeks to preserve national interests, traditionalist conservatism emphasizes the preservation of social order. Additionally, social conservatism emphasizes traditional family values which regulate moral behavior to preserve one's traditional status in society. National conservative parties often have roots in environments with a rural, traditionalist or peripheral basis, contrasting with the more urban support base of liberal conservative parties. In Europe, most embrace some form of Euroscepticism.

Most conservative parties in post-communist Central and Eastern Europe since 1989 have been national conservative.

Ideology

Social policies
Ideologically, national conservatives lean towards patriotism, nationalism, cultural conservatism, and monoculturalism, while opposing internationalism, globalism, multiculturalism, and cultural pluralism. National conservatives adhere to a form of cultural nationalism that emphasizes the preservation of national identity as well as cultural identity. As a result, many favor assimilation into the dominant culture, restrictions on immigration, and strict law and order policies.

National conservative parties are "socially traditional" and support 
traditional family values, gender roles, and religion. According to the Austrian political scientist Sieglinde Rosenberger, "national conservatism praises the family as a home and a center of identity, solidarity, and tradition". Many national conservatives are thus social conservatives.

Economic policies
National conservative parties in different countries do not necessarily share a common position on economic policy. Their views may range from support of a corporatism to a mixed economy to a laissez-faire approach. In the first, more common case, national conservatives can be distinguished from liberal conservatives, for whom free market economic policies, deregulation, and tight spending are the main priorities. Some commentators have indeed identified a growing gap between national and economic liberal conservatism: "Most parties of the Right [today] are run by economically liberal conservatives who, in varying degrees, have marginalized social, cultural, and national conservatives."

Regionalist conservatism 

In some contexts, the "nationalism" of a regional party may not align with the country to which the region belongs. South Tyrol is a notable example, as the "national conservative" movements there represent its majority German-speaking population, and identify with their German-speaking neighbors, particularly Austria, which borders South Tyrol, and with which South Tyrol shares cultural and historical ties.

List of national conservative political parties

Current national conservative parties, or parties with national conservative factions

The following political parties have been characterised as national conservative, at least as one of their ideological influences.
 Albania: Democratic Party of Albania, Republican Party of Albania
 Armenia: Conservative Party, Constitutional Rights Union, For Social Justice, Prosperous Armenia, Republican Party of Armenia, Sasna Tsrer Pan-Armenian Party, 5165 National Conservative Movement Party
 Austria: Freedom Party of Austria, Alliance for the Future of Austria
 Australia: Pauline Hanson's One Nation
 Bangladesh: Bangladesh Nationalist Party
 Belarus: BPF Party, Conservative Christian Party – BPF
 Belgium: Vlaams Belang
 Bosnia and Herzegovina: Party of Democratic Action, Democratic People's Alliance, Party of Democratic Progress
 Brazil: Alliance for Brazil, Progressistas, Brazilian Labour Party, Patriota
 Bulgaria: GERB, Revival, IMRO – Bulgarian National Movement, National Front for the Salvation of Bulgaria, Union of Democratic Forces, Democrats for a Strong Bulgaria, Democratic Party
 Cambodia: Cambodian People's Party
 Canada: People's Party of Canada
 Chile: Republican Party (Chile, 2019)
 Croatia: Homeland Movement, Croatian Sovereignists Croatian Democratic Union 
 Cyprus: Solidarity Movement 
 Czech Republic: Tricolour Citizens' Movement, Civic Democratic Party
 Denmark: Danish People's Party, The New Right, Denmark Democrats
 Estonia: Conservative People's Party of Estonia, Isamaa 
 Finland: Finns Party
 France: National Rally, France Arise, Movement for France, Action Française, Reconquête
 Georgia: Conservative Party of Georgia, Alliance of Patriots of Georgia
 Germany: Alternative for Germany, The Republicans, German Social Union
 Greece: Independent Greeks, Greek Solution, Golden Dawn, New Right
 Hungary: Fidesz, Christian Democratic People's Party, Independent Smallholders Party, Jobbik, Our Homeland Movement
 India: Bharatiya Janata Party, Hindu Mahasabha
 Indonesia: Great Indonesia Movement Party, Golkar
 Ireland: Fianna Fáil
 Israel: Likud, Yamina
 Italy: Brothers of Italy, Forza Italia (faction – Protagonist Italy), [Citizens' Union for South Tyrol, South Tyrolean Freedom (regionalist)]
 Japan: Liberal Democratic Party
 Kenya: Jubilee Party
 Latvia: National Alliance
 Liechtenstein: Progressive Citizens' Party
 Lithuania: Homeland Union, Order and Justice
 Luxembourg: Alternative Democratic Reform Party
 Malaysia: United Malays National Organisation
 Moldova: Șor Party
 Montenegro: New Serb Democracy
 Myanmar: Union Solidarity and Development Party
 Nepal: Rastriya Prajatantra Party
 Netherlands: Forum for Democracy, JA21
 North Macedonia: VMRO-DPMNE, VMRO – People's Party
 Norway: Progress Party, The Democrats
 Panama: Panameñista Party
 Paraguay: Colorado Party
 Philippines: Nacionalista Party
 Poland: United Right, (Law and Justice and United Poland), Confederation Liberty and Independence (factions, mainly National Movement), Right Wing of the Republic 
 Portugal: CDS – People's Party, Enough
 Romania: National Identity Bloc in Europe (Greater Romania Party and United Romania Party), Alliance for the Union of Romanians, People's Movement Party
 Russia: All-Russia People's Front (United Russia and Rodina), Great Russia, Russian All-People's Union
 Serbia: Democratic Party of Serbia, Serbian Radical Party, Serbian Patriotic Alliance, United Serbia, Serbian People's Party, People's Peasant Party, New Serbia, Better Serbia, Fatherland, People's Freedom Movement, Serbian Party Oathkeepers, Serbian Right, Obraz, Movement for the Restoration of the Kingdom of Serbia
 Singapore: People's Action Party
 Slovakia: We Are Family, Slovak National Party
 Slovenia: Slovenian Democratic Party
 South Korea: People Power Party
 Spain: Vox
 Sweden: Sweden Democrats
 Switzerland: Swiss People's Party, Federal Democratic Union
 Taiwan: Kuomintang (Chinese Nationalist Party), New Party
 Thailand: People's State Power Party
 Turkey: People's Alliance (Justice and Development Party and Nationalist Movement Party), Nation Alliance (factions, mainly Good Party) and Homeland Party
 Ukraine: Congress of Ukrainian Nationalists, People's Front, Svoboda, National Corps, Right Sector
 United Kingdom: Democratic Unionist Party, Traditional Unionist Voice, UK Independence Party, British Democrats, Reform UK, Conservative Party (UK) (faction)
 United States: Republican Party (factions), American Freedom Party

Defunct or formerly national conservative parties, or parties with national conservative factions
 Austria: Fatherland Front
 Belgium: Rexist Party, Vlaams Blok
 Brazil: Brazilian Integralist Action
 Canada: Union Nationale
 Czech Republic: Realists
 Czechoslovakia: Czechoslovak National Democracy, Party of National Unity
 France: Rally for the Republic
 Germany: German National People's Party, Deutsche Rechtspartei, The Blue Party, German People's Union
 Hungary: Hungarian Democratic Forum, Unity Party
 India: Bharatiya Jana Sangh
 Iran: Rastakhiz Party 
 Israel: National Union (Hatikva), Union of Right-Wing Parties
 Italy: National Fascist Party, Italian Nationalist Association, Italian Social Movement, National Alliance, The Right
 Norway: Fatherland League
 Poland: National Democracy, League of Polish Families, Kukiz'15
 Portugal: National Union
 Romania: Conservative Party,
 Slovakia: Slovak People's Party, Slovak National Party, People's Party – Movement for a Democratic Slovakia, Conservative Democrats of Slovakia
 South Africa: National Party
 South Korea: Democratic Republican Party Democratic Justice Party, New Korea Party, Liberty Korea Party
 Spain: FET y de las JONS, CEDA, People's Alliance
 Yugoslavia: Yugoslav Radical Union, Yugoslav National Movement

See also

Alliance of Conservatives and Reformists in Europe
European Alliance for Freedom
Europe of Nations and Freedom
Fascism
Movement for a Europe of Nations and Freedom
Nationalism
Nippon Kaigi
Neo-nationalism
Opposition to immigration
Paleoconservatism
Radical right (Europe)
Right-wing populism
Social conservatism
Souverainism
Traditionalist conservatism
The Virtue of Nationalism

References

 
Political science terminology
Conservatism
Conservatism-related lists
Right-wing ideologies